Victor Reginald Furr (26 April 1897 – 16 October 1976) was an English professional footballer who played as an outside right in the Football League for Watford.

Personal life 
Furr's three brothers, George, Harry and Willie, also played professional football. His sisters Amelia and Miriam married footballers William Grimes and George Payne respectively.

Career statistics

References

English footballers
English Football League players
Association football outside forwards
Southern Football League players
Hitchin Town F.C. players
Watford F.C. players
Sportspeople from Hitchin
1897 births
1976 deaths